Oulad Sidi Abdelhakem is a town in Jerada Province, Oriental, Morocco.  According to the 2014 census the municipality had a population of 2,207 people living in 392 households.

References

Populated places in Oriental (Morocco)
Jerada Province